Duck Lake is a lake in Blue Earth County, Minnesota, in the United States. It is nearby the city of Madison Lake, Minnesota.

Duck Lake was named for the duck, a popular family of waterfowl seen in the area.

References

Lakes of Minnesota
Lakes of Blue Earth County, Minnesota